West Texas Investors Club was an American television docu-series which airs on CNBC. The series follows self-made millionaires Mike 'Rooster' McConaughey and Wayne 'Butch' Gilliam meeting entrepreneurs in Texas, offering them the chance to pitch their products and secure funding from Rooster and Butch. The eight part hour-long series was commissioned by CNBC in January 2015 and is produced by The Ebersol Lanigan Company.

Both hosts Mike 'Rooster' McConaughey and Wayne 'Butch' Gilliam made their fortune largely from oil related businesses. Gil Prather, a musician, also features in the series. Rooster is the older brother of actor Matthew McConaughey.

In the first season of the series, McConaughey and Gilliam invested a total of 1.97 million.

Broadcast
The series premiered in the United States on CNBC on August 4, 2015, with episodes airing each week. The series was renewed for a second season in September 2015, which premiered on June 7, 2016.

Episodes

Season 1 (2015)

Season 2 (2016)

References

External links
 
 
 
 West Texas Investors Club clubhouse location (Google Maps link)

2010s American television news shows
2015 American television series debuts
2016 American television series endings
CNBC original programming
English-language television shows
Television shows filmed in Texas